Gaspare Alessandri (17 March 1908 – 13 June 1997) was an Italian boxer. He competed in the men's featherweight event at the 1932 Summer Olympics.

References

External links
 

1908 births
1997 deaths
Italian male boxers
Olympic boxers of Italy
Boxers at the 1932 Summer Olympics
Sportspeople from Ancona
Featherweight boxers
20th-century Italian people